The 2004–05 season was Manchester City Football Club's third consecutive season playing in the Premier League, the top division of English football, and its eighth season since the Premier League was first created with Manchester City as one of its original 22 founding member clubs.  Overall, it was the team's 113th season playing in a division of English football, most of which have been spent in the top flight.

Season review

Players

First-team squad

Left club during season

Team kit
The team kit was produced by Reebok and the shirt sponsor was Thomas Cook.

Historical league performance
Prior to this season, the history of Manchester City's performance in the English football league hierarchy since the creation of the Premier League in 1992 is summarised by the following timeline chart – which commences with the last season (1991–92) of the old Football League First Division (from which the Premier League was formed).

Results

Pre-season

Thomas Cook Trophy

Premier League

Position in final standings

Results summary

Points breakdown

Points at home: 30
Points away from home: 22

Points against "Big Four" teams: 9
Points against promoted teams: 11

6 points: Aston Villa, Crystal Palace, Portsmouth 
4 points: Charlton Athletic, Chelsea, Norwich City, Southampton
3 points: Birmingham City, Bolton Wanderers, Liverpool  
2 points: Blackburn Rovers, Fulham
1 point: Arsenal, Manchester United, Middlesbrough, Newcastle United,
West Bromwich Albion
0 points: Everton, Tottenham Hotspur

Biggest & smallest 

Biggest home wins: 4–0 vs. Charlton Athletic, 28 August 2004
Biggest home defeat: 0–2 vs. Manchester United, 13 February 2005 
Biggest away win: 1–3 vs. Portsmouth, 20 November 2004 
Biggest away defeat: 2–0 vs. West Bromwich Albion, 22 January 2005 

Biggest home attendance: 47,221 vs. Middlesbrough, 15 May 2005 
Smallest home attendance: 42,453 vs. Birmingham City, 20 April 2005 
Biggest away attendance: 67,863 vs. Manchester United, 7 November 2004 
Smallest away attendance: 20,101 vs. Portsmouth, 20 November 2004

Results by round

Individual match reports

League Cup

FA Cup

Playing statistics

Information current as of 15 May 2005 (end of season)

Goalscorers

All competitions

Premier League

League Cup and FA Cup

Information current as of 15 May 2005 (end of season)

Transfers and loans

Transfers in

Transfers out

Loans in

Loans out

References

Manchester City F.C. seasons
Manchester City
Articles which contain graphical timelines